Stark Electric Jesus is a 2014 short film inspired by the poem Prochondo Boidyutik Chhutar or Stark Electric Jesus written by Malay Roy Choudhury. The film has won the official selection as the only Indian film at the Trinidad and Tobago Film Festivalin New Media section  and has been selected for screening at Leeds Independent Film Festival. The film also won 27 official selection in 20 different countries and also won 'Best Video Art' from Poland, 'Most Promising Artist' Award from Madatac, 06, Spain and 'Best Fantasy Film' award from Hrizantema International Horror and Fantasy Film Festival, Serbia.

Plot
A mentally disordered man hallucinates and dreams 'unnatural' things where comes references of mythology, sexual identity and protest against sexual harassment.

Cast
Anirban Laulaa as bride from the refugees
Kingshuk Das as a refugee
Mriganka sekhar Ganguly as Mental Patient
Satyajit Biswas as Groom From the Refugees
Srija Bhattacharya as Sex worker 
Sudipta Das as Sex worker
Sanjukta Ghosh as bride from the refugees

Cine-poem
This is probably the first cine-poem (cine-poetry) or poefilm or Film-poem in India. It breaks the narrative structure and creates a language of poetry in film.

Selections and awards
Zoom International Film Festival, Poland (2016)
Feminist and Queer International Film Festival (Nov 2015)
Bucharest, Romania
Hrizantema International Horror & Fantasy Film Festival (Nov 2015)
Subotica, Serbia/Montenegro
Awards
Best Fantasy Film
Festival de Cine Experimental de Bogotá / CineAutopsia (Sep 2015)
Bogotá, Colombia
Awards
Nomination for Best Film - Coctel Inauguración [Sala Fundadores]
Cinema Perpetuum Mobile International Short Film Festival (Apr 2015)
Minsk, Belarus
Awards
Nomination for Best Experimental Film
Family Film Project (Dec 2014)
Porto, Portugal
Awards
Nomination for Best Film
Madatac - Contemporary Festival of New Media Arts & Advanced Audio Visual Technologies (Dec 2014)
Barcelona, Spain
Awards
Most Promising Video Artist Award
International Frontale film festival (Nov 2014)
Wiener Neustadt, Austria
Awards
Nomination for Best Film
Festival Internacional de Cinema Gai i Lèsbic de Barcelona (Oct 2014)
Barcelona, Spain
Awards
Nominee for Best Short Film-LGTIB Award
No Gloss Film Festival (Oct 2014)
Leeds, United Kingdom
Paris Festival for Different and Experimental Cinemas (Oct 2014)
Paris, France
Awards
Nomination for Best Prix : Compétition Internationale
CologneOFF X – 10th Cologne International Videoart Festival( (Sep 2014)
Cologne, Germany
Gender Reel Festival (Sep 2014)
Boston, U S A
Trinidad & Tobago Film Festival (Sep 2014)
Port of Spain, Trinidad and Tobago
WNDX Festival of Moving Image (Sep 2014)
Manitoba, Cameroon
flEXiff 2014 (The Twelfth and the Last Experimental International Film Festival (Sep 2014)
Sydney, Australia
Fuencaliente Rural Film Festival (Aug 2014)
Balearic Islands, Spain
Haxan Film Festival (Aug 2014)
Oakland, U S A
Dialogues International LGBT Film Festival(2015)
Kolkata, India
Les Lieux de Traverse Vidéo: Du 17 Au 31 Mars
Post Mortem, Mexico

References

External links

Films set in Kolkata
Indian independent films
Films shot in India
2014 films
Indian short films